José Luis Mayoz (born 15 January 1951) is a Spanish racing cyclist. He rode in the 1980 Tour de France.

References

External links
 

1951 births
Living people
Spanish male cyclists
Place of birth missing (living people)
Sportspeople from Álava
Cyclists from the Basque Country (autonomous community)